Triclonella euzosta is a moth in the family Cosmopterigidae. It is found in Panama.

References

Natural History Museum Lepidoptera generic names catalog

Cosmopteriginae
Moths of Central America
Moths described in 1912